The neuroblastoma breaking point family (NBPF) is a family of genes involved in neuronal development. The family is highly specific to primates, with minimal similarity or presence in other mammals and no presence in other animals, and its genes' content has been subject to a very high number of duplications in humans. It was described by Vandepoele et al. in 2005 and named as such because NBPF1 was found to be broken by a chromosomal translocation in a neuroblastoma patient.

The NBPF genes contain multiple copies of the Olduvai domain. A higher number of copies of this domain has been found to be correlated with brain size and autism severity, while a lower number of copies has been found to be correlated with schizophrenia severity. The only other gene known to have an Olduvai domain is myomegalin, which is believed to be the origin of the NBPF genes as it has orthologues in more basal mammals. Additionally, myomegalin is adjacent to many of the NBPF genes on chromosome 1q21. The first three genes are located at 1p36, while the next four are located at 1p12 and the next eleven at 1q21.

Genes 

 NBPF1
 NBPF2P
 NBPF3
 NBPF4
 NBPF5
 NBPF6
 NBPF7
 NBPF8
 NBPF9
 NBPF10
 NBPF11 (NBPF24)
 NBPF12
 NBPF13P
 NBPF14
 NBPF15 (NBPF16)
 NBPF17P (NBPF23)
 NBPF18P
 NBPF19
 NBPF20
 NBPF21P
 NBPF22P
NBPF26

"P" indicates a pseudogene.

See also 

1q21.1 deletion syndrome
 1q21.1 duplication syndrome
Olduvai domain

References 

Gene families